Pseudagrion camerunense is a species of damselfly in the family Coenagrionidae. It is found in Benin, Cameroon, Côte d'Ivoire, Ghana, Guinea, Guinea-Bissau, Nigeria, and Togo. Its natural habitat is rivers.

References

Coenagrionidae
Insects described in 1899
Taxonomy articles created by Polbot